Lower Siamese Pond is located northwest of Holcombville, New York. Fish species present in the lake are brook trout, and black bullhead. There is carry down trail access off Chatiemac Road on the southeast shore. No motors are allowed on this lake.

References

Lakes of New York (state)
Lakes of Warren County, New York